The 2004–05 Toto Cup Leumit was the 16th time the cup was being contested as a competition for the second tier in the Israeli football league system, and the first time since 1998–99 that the competition was contested as a separate competition.

The competition was won by Maccabi Netanya, who had beaten Hapoel Kfar Saba 3–2 on penalties after 1–1 in the final.

Format
The 12 Israeli Permier League clubs were split into three groups, each with 4 clubs. The two top clubs in each group, Along with the two best third-placed clubs, advanced to the quarter-finals.

Group stage
The matches were played from 6 August to 30 November 2004.

Group A

Group B

Group C

Elimination rounds

Quarter-finals
{| class="wikitable" style="text-align: center"
|-
!Home Team
!Score
!Away Team
|-

Semi-finals

Final

See also
 2004–05 Toto Cup Al
 2004–05 Toto Cup Artzit

External links
 Israel Toto Cup 2004/05 

Leumit
Toto Cup Leumit
Toto Cup Leumit